Svatkovice is a village in Písek District in the South Bohemian Region of the Czech Republic.

The first written mention of it dates to 1486.

References

Villages in Písek District